Clathrozoellidae is a family of cnidarians belonging to the order Leptomedusae. The family consists of only one genus: Clathrozoella Stechow, 1921 .

References

Leptothecata
Monogeneric cnidarian families